Crisper or Crispers may refer to:

 Crisper drawer, or crisper, a compartment in a refrigerator 
 Crispers (snack food), a snack food by Nabisco
 Crispers (restaurant), a fast-casual restaurant chain in Florida, U.S.

See also 
 Crisp (disambiguation)
 CRISPR, a family of DNA sequences
 CRISPR gene editing